The Minot State Beavers men's ice hockey is a college ice hockey program that represents Minot State University. The team competes in the ACHA Division I level as an independent team. The team hosted the ACHA national tournament at All Seasons Arena in 2000.  Prior to 1984, the team was part of the NAIA, before the NAIA dropped ice hockey as part of their program. The team's head coach is Wyatt Waselenchuk.

Seasons

2012-2013

Freshmen Cody Hall, Brett Nespor, Bob Pond, Dallas Drysdale, Brody Haygarth, Ryan Curzon and Sam Benson joined the team in 2012.  Transfers William Kinsman and Jordan Willert also joined the team in 2012.  Defenseman, Kyle Stephens, returned to the team in 2012, after playing a year with the El Paso Rhinos. The Beavers entered the ACHA D1 Tournament at Edge Ice Arena in Bensenville, Illinois in 2013. It was the team's fourth consecutive year in a row in the tournament.  The Beavers, seated third in the tournament, finished 26-4 on the year and have the fewest losses of tournament participants.  The Beavers earned a first round bye. The Beavers defeated the Central Oklahoma Bronchos 5-0 is the second round on March 2, 2013.  The Beavers defeated the Oklahoma Sooners 5-4 in overtime in the quarter-finals on March 3, 2013. The Beavers defeated the Ohio Bobcats 5-1 on March 5 to advance to the ACHA National Championship.  The Beavers won the ACHA National Championship against  Lindenwood Lions 9-5 on March 6.

AWARDS

The Beavers had three ACHA All-Americans, Logan Herauf 3rd team, Nigel Dube 2nd team and Wyatt Waselenchuk 1st team. Goalie Wyatt Waselenchuk was named 2013 ACHA Player-of-the-Year. Head Coach Wade Regier was also named Coach-of-the-Year.

Players

Current roster

As of September 30, 2021.

References

External links

Minot State University
American Collegiate Hockey Association
Ice hockey teams in North Dakota